Petra Voge (née Sölter) (born 23 October 1962) is an East German cross-country skier who competed in the 1980s. She won a bronze medal in the 4 × 5 km relay at the 1982 FIS Nordic World Ski Championships in Oslo and finished seventh in the 5 km at those same championships. At the 1984 Winter Olympics in Sarajevo, she finished eighth in the 4 × 5 km relay.

Cross-country skiing results
All results are sourced from the International Ski Federation (FIS).

World Championships
 1 medals – (1 bronze)

World Cup

Season standings

Team podiums
 1 podium

Note:   Until the 1999 World Championships, World Championship races were included in the World Cup scoring system.

References

External links
Women's 4 × 5 km cross-country relay Olympic results: 1976-2002 

World Championship results 
Petra Voge on Sports-Reference.com

Cross-country skiers at the 1984 Winter Olympics
German female cross-country skiers
Living people
1962 births
FIS Nordic World Ski Championships medalists in cross-country skiing